Joseph William Moffet (June 1859 – February 24, 1935) was an American professional baseball player who played first base in the American Association for the 1884 Toledo Blue Stockings. His brother, Sam Moffet, also played professional baseball.

External links

Toledo Blue Stockings players
19th-century baseball players
1859 births
1935 deaths
Baseball players from West Virginia
Sportspeople from Wheeling, West Virginia
Bozeman Irrigators players